Upper Peoria Lake is a section of the Illinois River primarily between Peoria County and Woodford County, Illinois, United States.  The lake runs from South Rome to Peoria Heights, with Spring Bay and the Detweiller Marina area of Peoria near the middle.  Just north of Peoria Heights, it empties through a narrow part of the Illinois River into the smaller Peoria Lake, sometimes called Lower Peoria Lake.

Lakes of Illinois
Bodies of water of Peoria County, Illinois
Bodies of water of Tazewell County, Illinois
Bodies of water of Woodford County, Illinois
Illinois River